Carlotta Valdes or Valdez may refer to:
Carlotta Valdes, fictional dead person in Hitchcock's film Vertigo
"Carlotta Valdez", song on Harvey Danger's 1997 album Where Have All the Merrymakers Gone?
Carlotta Valdes or Valdez, character in film Sex and Death 101
Carlotta Valdez, character in film "Hail, Caesar!"